Francis Bernard McClain (April 14, 1864 – October 11, 1925) was the 11th lieutenant governor of Pennsylvania from 1915 to 1919.

Biography 
McClain was born in Lancaster, Pennsylvania, during the American Civil War. He was the son of Francis McClain from Derry, Ireland. His mother was Susan Mulhatton from Lancaster, Pennsylvania. He attended parochial schools in Lancaster, Pennsylvania, and graduated from Lancaster High School Class of 1881. He received an honorary Doctorate of Laws from Villanova University 1919.  He worked as a cattle dealer and was instrumental in the formation of the Lancaster Live-Stock Exchange and was elected the first president. McClain married Ellen Bernardine O'Neill of Lancaster, Pennsylvania, on February 14, 1888 (Valentine's Day); they had one child, who died in infancy.

In 1894, McClain was elected as Republican to the state legislature, House of Representatives, for the State of Pennsylvania. He was re-elected in 1896, 1898, 1900,1902, 1904, 1906, and 1908. Vice-president of the Committee on Appropriations, he was also a member of other committees and special committees including, Ways and Means, and Corporations and Railroads.  Elected Speaker for the House of Representatives  1907–1909.  1910 elected Republican Mayor (24th) of Lancaster, Pennsylvania. 1911 re-elected for  4 years term as mayor.  He resigned January 6, 1915, to qualify for office of (11th) Lt. Governor for the State of Pennsylvania, which he was then elected to in November 1914.

McClain was a member of several charitable and philanthropic organisations. Some of these were: trustee of Home for Friendless Children, director of Lancaster Historical Society, member of the Union League of Philadelphia, Pennsylvania, member of the Young Republican Club, vice-president of the Thaddeus Stevens Industrial School of Lancaster, member of the Moose Lodge, director of the A. Herr-Smith Library of Lancaster, member of the Elks, member of the American Club of Pittsburgh, Pennsylvania, member of the Saddle and Sirloin Club of Chicago, president for over 20 years of The Terrapin Club of Philadelphia, Pennsylvania.

McClain died in Lancaster, Pennsylvania, after a long illness, on October 11, 1925, aged 61 years old. He is buried in St. Mary's Roman Catholic Cemetery, Lancaster, Pennsylvania.  He was known as "The Red Rose of Lancaster" for the red rose he always wore in his lapel.(KFH)

References

External links
The Political Graveyard

1864 births
1925 deaths
Lieutenant Governors of Pennsylvania
Speakers of the Pennsylvania House of Representatives
Mayors of Lancaster, Pennsylvania
Republican Party members of the Pennsylvania House of Representatives